The CD-class naval drifters were armed naval drifters constructed in 1917 for the Royal Navy in Canada. 100 were ordered for use in British waters during World War I numbered from CD 1 to CD 100, of which 42 were transferred to the Royal Canadian Navy and 18 were transferred to the United States Navy. In British waters, they were used to patrol areas around Gibraltar and Bermuda. In Canadian waters, the Maritimes and in American waters, along the New England coast. Following the war, the drifters were either sold into mercantile service or scrapped. Some survived in British service to be used during World War II.

Background and description
In British waters, drifters were a type of fishing vessel with hauled drift nets. This was adapted by the Royal Navy for anti-submarine defence in approaches to harbours and ports by laying drift nets and snagging enemy submarines. In January 1917 the Royal Navy ordered 100 drifters from Canadian shipyards as part of a building programme in Canada. However, the Canadian government would manage the programme for the Royal Navy. The Royal Canadian Navy did not have anyone qualified to run such a programme, so the Canadian government brought in the vice president of Canada Steamship Lines to manage it.

The timber used in the drifters came from British Columbia. The vessels were propelled by a  vertical compound steam engine fed steam by one single-ended boiler, turning one screw. The ships were armed with one QF 6-pounder (57 mm) gun mounted forward. The main differences between them and their British-built counterparts were electric lighting instead of acetylene gas, a steam windlass instead of a capstan and the gun was further forward. The vessels had a standard ship's company of 23. A complaint against the design was the lack of separate officers quarters.

Ships in class

Service history
The drifters, though constructed in Canada, belonged to the Admiralty and were intended for use in British waters during World War I. However, in February 1917, the Royal Canadian Navy was informed that the drifters were to be transferred to Canada as part of the Admiralty's promise to support Canada's coastal patrol. Canada had not been informed prior to this and had been sending crews to the United Kingdom in preparation for the vessels' arrival. Canada did not want the drifters as they could neither catch nor kill a submarine nor did Canada have the manpower to crew the ships. Further difficulties arose when more training would be required as the drifter-type fishing vessel was not used in Canadian waters, and there was a lack of knowledge of the technology in Canada. In response the head of the Canadian naval service, Rear Admiral Charles Kingsmill ordered the drifter equipment removed on Canadian vessels and the drifters rearmed as patrol boats.

By October 1917, the Admiralty changed its position, requiring 50 drifters to be sent to British waters, with the remainder set aside for Canada. A further six were transferred from the Canadian allotment to the United States Navy as part of an exchange where two American torpedo boats and six submarine chasers patrolled off the Canadian Atlantic coast. Eventually, the British Admiralty settled on 42 drifters for Canadian service. Shortages of steel and marine fittings in Canadian yards led to delays. Further inexperience among Canadian builders in the construction of boilers and engines led to 42 of the former and 47 of the latter being built in the United States. Also affecting the construction was work stoppages and lack of workers after the American entry into the war as American shipbuilders began siphoning the work force with higher wages. After being completed the drifters being assembled in Quebec shipyards were sent to Quebec City to enter service and finish fitting out. The vessels began to arrive towards the end of 1917 with crews being sent from Halifax, Nova Scotia. 29 drifters entered service at Quebec City before the Saint Lawrence River froze over. The remaining drifters at Quebec City that had not finished fitting out were laid up through the winter months. Three unfinished hulls were destroyed at Sorel on 19 June 1917.

Some drifters were equipped with hydrophones and wireless telegraph to improve their anti-submarine detection abilities. However, their 6-pounder guns were deemed inadequate to take on German U-boats. Some drifters in Canadian service were manned by detachments from the Newfoundland section of the Royal Naval Reserve.Canadian drifters were employed at the harbours of Halifax and Sydney, Nova Scotia, usually in concert with naval trawlers either on minesweeping or patrol missions. They were also used as convoy escorts for convoys entering and departing the harbours. The drifters were employed as "scarecrows", intending to force U-boats to look for easier targets. Though the vessels were poorly finished and the crews inexperienced, the drifters performed their task of deterring U-boats from convoy targets. In Royal Navy service fourteen of them were sent to Gibraltar, six to Bermuda and five were sent to West Africa in 1918–1919. In the end, 18 were transferred to the United States Navy, seeing service in the First Naval District. The drifters were returned to Canada in mid-1919 and sold.

After the war, the drifters in Canadian service were laid up in reserve at Halifax. On 5 November 1919 a storm struck Halifax Harbour in which 32 drifters were damaged. By 1920, most of the Canadian drifters had been sold, with the last four sold in 1921. Some of the British drifters saw service during World War II.

See also
List of Royal Navy ships
List of ships of the Royal Canadian Navy

Notes

Citations

References